Viljandi County ( or Viljandimaa) is one of 15 counties of Estonia. It is located in southern Estonia bordering Pärnu, Järva, Jõgeva, Tartu and Valga counties.

History 
Viljandimaa, under the German name of Kreis Fellin, was an important centre of commerce and power in the Middle Ages. Today, there are numerous castle ruins there dating from that time.

Soomaa National Park is a national park located partially within Viljandi County, Estonia. Soomaa ("land of bogs") protects  390 km2, and is a Ramsar site of protected wetlands. The park was created in 1993.

County government 
The County government is led by Governor, who is appointed by the Government of Estonia for a term of five years. Currently the Governor position is held by Kalle Küttis.

Municipalities 
The county is subdivided into municipalities. There is one urban municipality ( – towns) and three rural municipalities ( – parishes) in Viljandi County.

Religion

Gallery

References

External links 

Viljandimaa – Official website
Viljandi County Government 

 
Counties of Estonia